Wildhood is a 2021 Canadian coming-of-age romantic drama film, written, produced, and directed by Bretten Hannam.

An expansion of Hannam's earlier short film Wildfire, which was the winner of the award for Best Short Film at the Screen Nova Scotia awards in 2020, the film stars Phillip Lewitski as Lincoln, a young man in his late teens who was raised disconnected from his maternal Mi'kmaq heritage by his abusive white father Arvin (Joel Thomas Hynes); following the discovery that his mother Sarah, whom he had long been told was dead, is in fact still alive, he takes his younger half-brother Travis (Avery Winters-Anthony) on a journey to find her. En route, they meet the openly two-spirit Pasmay (Joshua Odjick), who becomes both a guide to Lincoln in reconnecting with his indigenous roots and a love interest.

The cast also includes Michael Greyeyes, Savonna Spracklin, Jordan Poole, Samuel Davison and Steve Lund.

Cast

Production and distribution

The film's screenplay won Telefilm Canada's Pitch This! competition at the 2018 Toronto International Film Festival, and was funded by Telefilm Canada in 2019. The film entered production in 2020 in the Windsor, Nova Scotia area.

The film premiered at the 2021 Toronto International Film Festival on September 10, 2021. It was subsequently screened at the 2021 Cinéfest Sudbury International Film Festival, the 2021 Atlantic Film Festival, and the 2021 Vancouver International Film Festival. It has been acquired for commercial distribution by Films Boutique.

Critical response
On the review aggregator website Rotten Tomatoes, the film has a 100% approval rating, based on 35 reviews, with an average rating of 7.5/10. The website's consensus reads, "A coming-of-age story with several refreshing twists, Wildhood sends its protagonist on a bittersweet, beautifully filmed journey."

Lovia Gyarkye of The Hollywood Reporter reviewed the film favourably, writing that "The trio’s dynamic is entertaining, and they crack jokes with the same fierceness with which they argue. But it’s the evolving romance between Link and Pasmay that’s the most fun to witness. Maybe I’m a sucker for romance, but watching Link and Pasmay steal glances and exchange knowing smirks begins to feel more thrilling than the journey itself. Lewitski, who stars in Hulu’s Utopia Falls, and Odjick have a subtle and exciting chemistry that makes rooting for their budding love easy. The progress of that love is measured by the proximity of their bodies, which, as they get closer to finding Sarah, feel bound by an almost spiritual force."

For The Coast, Morgan Mullin wrote that "the movie is at its strongest when it turns away from the family that abandoned its leads and leans into their frisson-filled connection instead (even if their most intimate moment borrows a touch too heavily from Moonlight). Traipsing the countryside together and awash in that magic-hour light, the two youth learn to be themselves while Pasmay teaches Link pow wow dancing."

Awards

References

External links

2021 films
2021 drama films
2021 LGBT-related films
Canadian LGBT-related films
Canadian coming-of-age drama films
LGBT-related coming-of-age films
LGBT-related drama films
Films shot in Nova Scotia
Films set in Nova Scotia
First Nations films
LGBT First Nations culture
Canadian romantic drama films
2020s Canadian films